The 1986 FIFA World Cup final was the final of the 1986 FIFA World Cup, held in Mexico. The match was held at the Estadio Azteca in Mexico City on 29 June 1986 and had an attendance of 114,600. It was contested by Argentina and West Germany. Argentina won the match 3–2 in regulation time.

Route to the final

Match

Summary

José Luis Brown opened the scoring for Argentina in the 23rd minute with a header after an error of the German Keeper Harald Schumacher on a free-kick from the right and it stayed at 1–0 until half-time. 11 minutes into the second half, Jorge Valdano doubled Argentina's lead with a low side foot finish after cutting in from the left past the advancing goalkeeper. Karl-Heinz Rummenigge pulled a goal back in the 74th minute from close range for West Germany, his first goal in the tournament. West Germany then equalised in the 81st minute, with Rudi Völler scoring with a header from close range. Although Diego Maradona was heavily marked by Lothar Matthäus throughout the game, his pass to Jorge Burruchaga in the 84th minute allowed Argentina to regain the lead at 3–2 when he slid the ball past the advancing goalkeeper from the right and into the corner of the net. 

Six yellow cards were issued in this match, which was a record number until the 2010 FIFA World Cup Final. Two of them were issued because of timewasting from Argentine players. As the clock expired, Argentina celebrated their second World Cup victory in three tournaments after having won the 1978 World Cup on home soil.

Details

Aftermath

The second World Cup won by Argentina is regarded by many as the most important victory for an Argentine side. Four years later, both teams met in the final of the 1990 World Cup, with West Germany winning. This marked the first time two World Cup finalists met twice, a record later shared with Brazil and Italy, the 1970 and 1994 World Cup finalists. Argentina and Germany met in the 2014 final for a record third time as finalists.

With the 1986 defeat, German manager Franz Beckenbauer gained the distinction of having lost a World Cup final as a player (in 1966) and a manager. In 1990 he managed Germany to victory, becoming a winner of the World Cup as player (in 1974) and as manager.

Argentina would not see another world title for 36 years until their win over France in the 2022 final.

References

External links
 Argentina v West Germany | 1986 FIFA World Cup Final | Full Match

1
1986
1986
1986
Fifa World Cup Final 1986
Final
Final
Argentina–West Germany relations
Sports competitions in Mexico City
1980s in Mexico City
June 1986 sports events in North America